Ronaldo "Ronny" Bayan Zamora (born December 4, 1944) is a Filipino lawyer and politician who previously served as representative of the lone district of San Juan. He topped the bar exams in 1969 and was among the Ten Outstanding Young Men of the Philippines in 1972.  He is also a Senior Partner of Zamora Poblador Vasquez & Bretaña Law Offices. His brothers are Manuel “Manny” Zamora Jr. and Salvador “Buddy” Zamora.

Early life
Ronaldo Zamora was born on December 4, 1944 in Manila. He received his elementary and secondary education at De La Salle College (now De La Salle University). He then enrolled at University of Philippines Diliman, where he obtained his bachelor's degree in political science in 1965 and bachelor of laws in 1969, both as magna cum laude. He was the topnotcher of the bar exams in 1969.

Political career 
Zamora joined politics during the administration of Ferdinand Marcos at the Presidential Economic Staff, as the chief economist from 1966 to 1967, senior information officer from 1967 to 1970, Technical Assistant Staff Service Unit from 1970 to 1972. He later served under the Office of the President as Acting Assistant Executive Secretary from 1972 to 1974, Assistant Executive Secretary from 1974 to 1975, and Presidential Assistant for Legal Affairs from 1975 to 1978.

Zamora was first elected into public office in 1978 together with Imelda Marcos and 19 other candidates of the administration coalition Kilusang Bagong Lipunan as parliament members from Metro Manila. In 1984, when the constituency in the Batasang Pambansa was modified—to elect members by province and cities, instead of regions—Zamora ran for the parliamentary seat for San Juan–Mandaluyong but lost to opposition candidate Neptali Gonzales.

When Congress was restored under a new constitution in 1987, he ran and was elected representative of the lone district of San Juan–Mandaluyong in 1987 and 1992, and as representative of the lone district of San Juan in 1995. He was also elected as House Minority Floor Leader during the 10th Congress of the Philippines.

Barred from seeking another term in 1998, Zamora helped his long-time political ally and townsmate Joseph Estrada in his presidential bid in 1998. Estrada later appointed Zamora as his Executive Secretary. Zamora resigned from Estrada's cabinet at the height of Estrada's impeachment trial to run again as representative of San Juan in 2001 where he would be reelected again in 2004 and in 2007, for three terms. In the 14th Congress, Zamora was also elected as House Minority Floor Leader.

After stepping down from Congress upon being term-limited in 2010, Zamora served as a member of the Board of Directors of Nickel Asia Corporation, a mining company founded by his brother Manuel Jr., from 2011 to his retirement from the company in 2013. He also served as Chairman of the Rio Tuba Nickel Mining Corporation and later of Cagdianao Mining Corporation, subsidiaries of Nickel Asia Corporation.

In 2013, Zamora was elected as representative of San Juan. He served as House Minority Leader for the third time in the 16th Congress of the Philippines. He was re-elected in 2016 and 2019. He would retire from politics at the end of his term in 2022, according to his son Francis, who was elected Mayor of San Juan in 2019. He was succeeded by his daughter, Bel Zamora; his other daughter, Pammy Zamora, also assumed office as representative of Taguig's 2nd district on the same year.

References 

1944 births
Living people
Executive Secretaries of the Philippines
People from San Juan, Metro Manila
Members of the House of Representatives of the Philippines from San Juan, Metro Manila
Minority leaders of the House of Representatives of the Philippines
Filipino business executives
20th-century Filipino lawyers
University of the Philippines Diliman alumni
Estrada administration cabinet members
Members of the Batasang Pambansa
PDP–Laban politicians
Nacionalista Party politicians